Betty Jean Ward (born September 12, 1944) is an American actress. She is the creator and the star of Stand-Up Opera, a musical one-woman show.

Personal life
Ward was first married to Donald Trenner in 1966, they divorced in 1978, but they each remained one another's dearest and closest friends until his death on May 16, 2020. 

She was later married to director Gordon Hunt from 1995 until his death in 2016. Her stepdaughter is actress Helen Hunt.

Acting career

Early career
She made her debut on the stage in 1960, in the original off-Broadway production of The Fantasticks, where she was an understudy for the role of Luisa/the Girl. B.J. Ward had gotten the part by calling the producer of the show.

She toured with the Groundlings for a short while before starting her own voice over career starting with Hanna-Barbera's Jana of the Jungle in 1978.

Voice acting career
Ward is best known as a voice actress. Her animation voice credits include:

 Scarlett on G.I. Joe
 The title role on Jana of the Jungle
 Deena Strong on Robo Force: The Revenge of Nazgar
 Betty Ross in The Incredible Hulk
 Panky and Punkin on The Pink Panther and Sons
 Casey Kelp, Celia and Lil' Seaweed in Snorks
 Bjørn's wife in The Little Troll Prince
 Velma Dinkley in Scooby-Doo on Zombie Island, Scooby-Doo and the Witch's Ghost, Scooby-Doo and the Alien Invaders and Scooby-Doo and the Cyber Chase.
 Betty Rubble in various Flintstones productions from the 1980s to the early 2000s.
 Princess Allura, Witch Haggar and all of the female voices on Voltron, with the exception of Queen Merla, who is voiced by Tress MacNeille
 Melissa Duck in The Duxorcist on Daffy Duck's Quackbusters
 Lady from The Biskitts
 Tom's Owner from Tom and Jerry: The Movie
 Whopper in Pound Puppies
 Butch in The Little Rascals
 Dr. Erica Slade in Sky Commanders
 Elektra in Space Stars
 Harmond in TaleSpin
 Tommy Stubbins in The Voyages of Doctor Dolittle
 Mrs. Brown in Paddington Bear
 Mage, Halinor in W.I.T.C.H.
 Teresa Bobcat (Bubsy's niece), Oblivia Cat and Ally Cassandra in the Bubsy TV pilot.
 Fanny Frog in Saturday Supercade (Frogger segment)
 Iris the computer in The Real Adventures of Jonny Quest
 Winnie Woodpecker in The New Woody Woodpecker Show
 Small Foot in Challenge of the GoBots
 Glinda the Good Witch of the North in The Wizard of Oz
 Wonder Woman in The Super Powers Team: Galactic Guardians
 Cassandra Cross and Lilith Cross in The Centurions
 Shaggy's Mom, Sugie Rogers, Evil Babysitter, Rona Lickton, and others in A Pup Named Scooby-Doo
 Grumpella in The Little Engine That Could
 Zippy, singing voice of Judy Jetson in Rockin' with Judy Jetson
 Googie and Repulsa in Scooby-Doo and the Reluctant Werewolf
 Desert Flower, Rusty Nails, and others in The Good, the Bad, and Huckleberry Hound
 Galli in Gallavants
 Megellenic in The Pebble and the Penguin
 Mrs. Bucktooth in Christopher and Holly a.k.a. The Bears Who Saved Christmas
 The Queen of Hearts in The Pagemaster (Her only line is to scream "OFF WITH HIS HEAD!" at Richard Tyler, the main character of the movie)
 Aunt Margaret in Curious George
 Joel's mother in Ben 10 (Episode "Big Fat Alien Wedding")
 Queen Bea in 2 Stupid Dogs (Episode "Queen Bea")
 Additional Voices in The Mask: Animated Series 
 M3 in Batman: The Animated Series (episode "The Lion and the Unicorn")
 Witch Hag in Samurai Jack (Episode XXX)
 Mayor Waters in The Spectacular Spider-Man (Episode "Persona")
 Doctor Bittersweet in Totally Spies (Episode "Passion Patties")
 Duke's Mom, Connie Hauser in G.I. Joe: Renegades (Episode "Homecoming Part One")
 Dr. Asinovskovich, Lady, and Woman in Regular Show (Episode "Grilled Cheese Deluxe")
 The Mistress of Baskerville Manor in Droopy, Master Detective (Episode "Sherlock Droopy")
 Brunhilda Bear and Buttercup Bear in The New Yogi Bear Show (Episode "Yogi De Beargerac")
 Raye Fay in Monster in My Pocket: The Big Scream
 Additional voices in The Bugs Bunny Show
 Additional voices in Mighty Max
 Additional voices in Captain Planet and the Planeteers
 Additional voices in James Bond Jr.
 Additional Voices in Super Dave: Daredevil for Hire

Live-action career
In 1985, she made a rare film appearance in the TV movie Malice in Wonderland alongside Elizabeth Taylor and Jane Alexander.

Ward has also guest-starred on television series such as Frasier, ER, and In-Laws.

Video game career
Ward has also done voices for video games, including:
 Scooby-Doo! Night of 100 Frights
 Stonekeep
 Grandia II
 Jade Empire (Hui the Brave, Old Mother Kwan, additional voices)
 Legacy of Kain (Additional voices in multiple titles in series)
 Forgotten Realms: Demon Stone
 Sword of the Berserk: Guts' Rage
 Baldur's Gate II
 Arc the Lad: Twilight of the Spirits
 Onimusha 3
 Orphen: Scion of Sorcery

Other acting and singing work
In addition, she has also done voiceovers for theme parks, including:
 Voices for EPCOT and Disneyland Paris, including the safety narration for Spaceship Earth from 1994 to 2007.
 The narration of the former PeopleMover attraction at Disneyland.
 Mother / Sarah in the 1993 version of the Walt Disney's Carousel of Progress.
 Some of the singing voices ("Burrow's Rabbit", opossums and rabbits) in Splash Mountain
 The current voice guide for “It's a Small World” and the refurbished Tomorrowland Transit Authority PeopleMover attraction at Magic Kingdom Park.

Filmography

Television
The Bugs Bunny Show – Additional voices (1960)
Jana of the Jungle – Jana (1978) 
Space Stars – Elektra (1981) 
The Little Rascals – Butch / Waldo (1982)
Pac Preview Party – TV Movie – Butch / Waldo (1982)
Spider-Man – Medusa / Namorita (1982)
The Incredible Hulk – Betty Ross / Alicia Masters (1982)
The Smurfs – Hermes, Additional Voices (1982–1989)
Alvin & The Chipmunks (1983)
G.I. Joe: A Real American Hero: The M.A.S.S. Device – TV Mini-Series – Scarlett (1983)
Pink Panther and Sons – Panky / Punkin (1984) 
Super Friends: The Legendary Super Powers Show – Jayna (1984)
G.I. Joe: The Revenge of Cobra – TV Mini-Series –  Scarlett (1984)
The New Scooby-Doo Mysteries (1984)
The Voyages of Dr. Dolittle – Tommy Stubbins (1984)
Snorks – Casey Kelp (1984–1988)
The 13 Ghosts of Scooby-Doo – episode – When You Witch Upon a Star – Marcella (1985)
The Jetsons (1985)
Star Fairies – TV Movie – Sparkle / Michelle / Mother (1985)
Challenge of the GoBots – Small Foot (1985)
G.I. Joe:The Pyramid of Darkness – TV Mini-Series –  Scarlett (1985)
The Super Powers Team: Galactic Guardians – Wonder Woman / Young Bruce Wayne (1985)
G.I. Joe – Scarlett / Reporter / Harper Supporter /Pelar Vasquez / Flo Breckinridge / additional Voices (1985–1986)  
The Centurions – Cassandra Cross / Lilith Cross (1986)
My Little Pony -TV Series- Surprise and North Star (1986)
Jonny Quest – Additional Voices (1986)
The Bugs Bunny and Tweety Show – Various Characters (1986)
The Flintstone Kids – Betty Jean Bricker / Mrs. Rockbottom (1986–1988)
Foofur (1987)
DuckTales – episode – Top Duck – Birdie McQuack / Loopie McQuack (1987)
Popeye and Son – Rad (1987)
Sky Commanders – Dr. Erica Slade (1987) 
Superman – Additional Voices (1988) 
The New Yogi Bear Show – Additional Voices (1988)
A Pup Named Scooby-Doo – Mrs. Rogers / Sugie Rogers / Babysitter (1988) 
The Flintstone Kids' "Just Say No" Special – TV Special – Betty Bricker / Mrs. Gravelson / Female Announcer (1988)
The Completely Mental Misadventures of Ed Grimley – Additional Voices (1988)
Bugs vs. Daffy: Battle of the Music Video Stars – TV Special – Additional voices (1988)
Fantastic Max – Additional Voices (1988–1989)
Matlock – episode – The Black Widow – Bernice Wooley (1989)
Midnight Patrol: Adventures in the Dream Zone (1990)
Tiny Toon Adventures – episode – Fields of Honey – Honey (1990)
The Wizard of Oz – Glinda the Good (1990)
Yo Yogi! (1991)
The Pirates of Dark Water – Additional Voices (1991)
Darkwing Duck – Additional Voices / Patricia / Gloria Swansong (1991)
James Bond Jr. (1991)
TaleSpin – episode – Louie's Last Stand – Records Clerk (1991)
Fish Police – episode – The Shell Game – Widow Casino (1992)
Capitol Critters – Additional voices (1992–1995)
A Flintstone Family Christmas – TV Special – Betty Rubble (1993)
The Town Santa Forgot – TV Special (1993)
Bonkers – Additional Voices (1993)
Murder, She Wrote – episode – Love's Deadly Desire – Chairwoman (1993)
Shining Time Station – episode – Becky Makes a Wish – performs the song "Help Your Wish Along" (1993)
The Flintstones: Wacky Inventions – Video short – Betty Rubble (1994)
Captain Planet and the Planeteers – episode – Twilight Ozone – Federal Spokesman (1994)
Batman: The Animated Series – episode – The Lion and the Unicorn – M3 (1995)
Daisy-Head Mayzie – TV Special – Mrs. McGrew (1995)
Gargoyles – episodes – A Lighthouse in the Sea of Time, Pendragon & Sentinel – Fleance / Professor Duane / Lady of the Lake (1995–1996)
The Story of Santa Claus – TV special – Additional Voices (1996)
Gargoyles: The Goliath Chronicles – episode – The Journey – Billy's Mom / Fleance / Alexander (1996)
The Real Adventures of Jonny Quest – Iris the Computer / Nurse Holloway (1996–1997) 
Adventures from the Book of Virtues – additional voices (1996–1998)
Johnny Bravo – episodes -Johnny Bravo/Jungle Boy in 'Mr. Monkeyman'/Johnny Bravo and the Amazon Women, The Sensitive Male/Bravo Dooby Doo & I Used to Be Funny/My Fair Dork/'Twas the Night – Velma Dinkley / Aunt Jebidisa / additional voices (1997)
The Cartoon Cartoon Show – Female computer / Stanley / Amazon (1997)
Cow and Chicken – Betty Rubble (1998)
The Scooby-Doo Project – TV Short – Velma Dinkley (1999)
The Bunny Years – TV Movie documentary – Herself (1999)
Timon & Pumbaa – episode – The Spy's the Limit/Ready, Aim, Fire (1999)
Batman Beyond – episode – Out of the Past – Singer (2000)
The New Woody Woodpecker Show – Winnie Woodpecker / Mother Nature (1999–2001)
Courage the Cowardly Dog – Additional Voices (2002)
The 1st 13th Annual Fancy Anvil Award Show Program Special... Live!... in Stereo – TV Special – Betty Rubble (2002) 
Samurai Jack – Witch Hag
Curious George – Aunt Margaret / Aunt Margret (2006–2020)
The Spectacular Spider-Man – episode – Persona – Mayor Waters (2008)
Regular Show – Dr. Asinovskovich (2010)
G.I. Joe: Renegades- episode – Homecoming Part 1 – Connie Hauser (2011)

Film
The New Maverick – TV Movie – B.J. Vinnie's Henchman (1978) 
GoBots: Battle of the Rock Lords – Small Foot (1986)
G.I. Joe: The Movie – Video – Scarlett (1987)
The Duxorcist – Looney Tunes Short – Melissa Duck (1987)
Rockin' with Judy Jetson – TV Movie – Zippy (1988)
The Good, the Bad, and Huckleberry Hound – TV Movie – Chieftess / Desert Flower / Elderly Lady / Girl / Rusty Nails (1988)
Pound Puppies and the Legend of Big Paw – Whopper (1988)
Scooby-Doo! and the Reluctant Werewolf – TV Movie – Googie / Repulsa (1988)
Daffy Duck's Quackbusters – Melissa Duck (1988)
Jetsons: The Movie (1990)
The Funtastic World of Hanna-Barbera – Short – Betty Rubble (1990)
Queen Esther – Video short – (1992)
Bugs Bunny's Creature Features – TV Movie (1992)
Jonny's Golden Quest – TV Movie – 3-DAC (1993)
I Yabba-Dabba Do! – TV Movie – Betty Rubble (1993)
Tom and Jerry: The Movie – Tom's Owner (1993)
Hollyrock-a-Bye Baby – TV Movie – Betty Rubble (1993)
The Lion King – Lions (1994)
The Pagemaster – Queen of Hearts (1994)
A Flintstones Christmas Carol – TV Movie – Betty Rubble (1994)
Tom and Jerry's Christmas Carol – Video – Velma Dinkley (1997)
Scooby-Doo on Zombie Island – Video – Velma Dinkley (1998)
The Brave Little Toaster to the Rescue – Video – Police Lady (1999)
Scooby-Doo! and the Witch's Ghost – Video – Velma Dinkley (1999)
Scooby-Doo and the Alien Invaders – Video – Velma Dinkley (2000)
Scooby-Doo and the Cyber Chase – Video – Velma Dinkley / Cyber-Velma Dinkley (2001)
Curious George: A Very Monkey Christmas – TV Movie – Aunt Margaret (2009)
DC Super Hero Girls: Hero of the Year – Video – Master Alchemist (2016)

Video games
Blazing Dragons – Video Game – The Lady of the Lake, Rapunsel Yablanowitz (1996)
 Sword of the Berserk: Guts' Rage – Video Game – Casca, Eriza (1999)
Star Trek: Starfleet Command: Volume II: Empires at War – Video Game (2000)
Scooby-Doo: Classic Creep Capers – Video Game – Velma Dinkley (2000)
Star Trek: Deep Space Nine: The Fallen – Video Game - Additional voices (2000)
Grandia II - Video Game - Roan, Elmo (2000)
Scooby-Doo and the Cyber Chase – Video Game – Velma Dinkley (2001)
Star Trek: Starfleet Command III – Video Game – Romulan Officer No. 1 (2002)
Scooby-Doo! Night of 100 Frights – Video Game – Velma Dinkley (2002)
Star Trek: Elite Force II – Video Game – Katarina Scott (2003)
Samurai Jack: Battle Through Time – Witch Hag (2020)

References

External links
 
 B. J. Ward at Voice Chasers 

Living people
American musical theatre actresses
American film actresses
American voice actresses
American video game actresses
Actresses from Delaware
Hanna-Barbera people
20th-century American actresses
21st-century American actresses
20th-century American singers
21st-century American singers
20th-century American women singers
21st-century American women singers
1944 births